The American Journal of Primatology is a monthly peer-reviewed scientific journal and the official journal of the American Society of Primatologists. It was established in 1981 and covers all areas of primatology, including the behavioral ecology, conservation biology, evolutionary biology, life history, demography, paleontology, physiology, endocrinology, genetics, molecular genetics, and psychobiology of non-human primates. Besides its regular issues, the journal publishes a yearly supplementary issue detailing the program of the society's annual meetings. The editor-in-chief is Karen Bales (UC Davis).  The types of papers published are: original research papers, review articles, book reviews, commentaries, and plenary addresses.

According to the Journal Citation Reports, the journal has a 2020 impact factor of 2.371, ranking it 35th out of 175 journals in the category "Zoology".

References

External links 
 Official website
 American Society of Primatologists

Primatology journals
Wiley-Liss academic journals
Monthly journals
English-language journals
Publications established in 1981